FC Malamuk is a football club from Greenland based in Uummannaq. All league games, however, are played in the national stadium in Nuuk.

Malamuk midfielder Kaassa Zeeb featured in the Greenland national football team at the 2006 ELF Cup.

Achievements 
Coca Cola GM: 1
Champion : 2004

External links
 Official clubsite

Malamuk
Association football clubs established in 1979
1979 establishments in Greenland